The All-Ireland Senior B Hurling Championship of 1988 was the 15th staging of Ireland's secondary hurling knock-out competition.  London won the championship, beating Down 2-6 to 1-7 in the final at the Emerald GAA Grounds, Ruislip.

References

 Donegan, Des, The Complete Handbook of Gaelic Games (DBA Publications Limited, 2005).

1988
Hurling
B